Marianthi Zafeiriou (born ) is a Greek group rhythmic gymnast. She represents her nation at international competitions. 

She participated at the 2012 Summer Olympics in London.
She also competed at world championships, including at the 2010 and 2011 World Rhythmic Gymnastics Championships.

References

External links

https://database.fig-gymnastics.com/public/gymnasts/biography/14765/true?backUrl=%2Fpublic%2Fresults%2Fdisplay%2F1862%3FidAgeCategory%3D8%26idCategory%3D80%23anchor_2334
http://www.intlgymnast.com/index.php?option=com_content&view=article&id=3349:fig-releases-official-olympic-roster&catid=92:2012-olympic-news&Itemid=242

1994 births
Living people
Greek rhythmic gymnasts
Place of birth missing (living people)
Gymnasts at the 2012 Summer Olympics
Olympic gymnasts of Greece
Gymnasts from Athens